Global Peace and Justice Auckland (GPJA) describes itself as "a network of people who provide a platform for individuals and groups to discuss and organise co-operatively on peace and justice issues." They are well known for organising the Auckland component of the global February 15, 2003 anti-war protest that attracted 10, 000 people to protest the impending United States attack on Iraq.

GPJA also became notable when on March 19, 2005 a GPJA organised march of around 300 people who marched up Auckland's Queen Street and into the ANZ Bank on the corner of Victoria and Queen Streets.
As a result of the bank occupation a standoff between GPJA organisers and police began. After about an hour of occupying the bank and the road outside five people were arrested for allegedly blocking the road. Police tried to arrest GPJA organiser Simon Oosterman and protestors attempted to stop them resulting in violence between protestors and police.

See also
 List of anti-war organizations

References

External links
 GPJA official website

Anti-imperialism in Oceania
Anti–Iraq War groups
Peace organisations based in New Zealand
Organisations based in Auckland
2000s in Auckland